Abdurahman Al-Harazi (Arabic:عبد الرحمن الحرازي) (born 1 January 1994) is a Qatari footballer. He currently plays for Al-Ahli on loan from Al-Rayyan. He joined the Al-Rayyan Sports Club on Sept. 24, 2016 as a midfielder.

References

External links
 

Qatari footballers
1994 births
Living people
Al-Sailiya SC players
Al-Rayyan SC players
Al Ahli SC (Doha) players
Qatar Stars League players

Association football wingers